Nicolás Barrientos and Eduardo Struvay were the defending champions and successfully defended their title by defeating Guido Pella and Horacio Zeballos 3–6, 6–3, [11–9] in the final.

Seeds

Draw

Draw

References
 Main Draw

2014 ATP Challenger Tour
2014 Doubles
2014 in Colombia